The Churches Conservation Trust, which was initially known as the Redundant Churches Fund, is a charity whose purpose is to protect historic churches at risk, those that have been made redundant by the Church of England. The Trust was established by the Pastoral Measure of 1968. The legally defined object of the Trust is "the preservation, in the interests of the nation and the Church of England, of churches and parts of churches of historic and archaeological interest or architectural quality vested in the Fund ... together with their contents so vested".  The charity cares for over 350 churches.  The Trust is financed partly by the Department for Culture, Media and Sport and the Church Commissioners, but grants from those bodies were frozen in 2001, since when additional funding has come from other sources, including the general public. In the 12 months ending 31 March 2010 the charity's income was £6,161,653, and its spending was £6,035,871.  During that year it had 44 employees, and used the services of 2,000 volunteers.  The charity is run by a board of trustees, who delegate the day-to-day management to a chief executive and his senior management team.

The Trust's primary aim is to ensure that the buildings in its care are weatherproof and to prevent any deterioration in their condition.  The majority of the churches remain consecrated, and are used often for occasional services where this is practical, while some are venues for concerts and other purposes. Local communities are encouraged to use them for appropriate activities and events, and the buildings provide an educational resource center, allowing children and young people to study history and architecture. Nearly 2 million people visit the Trust's churches each year.

This list describes the 74 churches preserved by the Churches Conservation Trust in the English Midlands, consisting of those in the counties of Derbyshire, Nottinghamshire, Shropshire, Staffordshire, Leicestershire, Rutland, Herefordshire, Worcestershire, Warwickshire, Northamptonshire, and Gloucestershire.  The ages of the churches spread from St Andrew's Church, Wroxeter, which contains fabric from the Anglo-Saxon period, to St John the Baptist's Church, Avon Dassett, which was built in 1868; most of the churches date from the 12th and 13th centuries.  All the churches have been designated by English Heritage as listed buildings, almost all of them at the higher Grades (I and II*).  Some of the churches stand in the centres of cities or towns, and their functions have been taken over by nearby churches; these include St Peter's Church, Northampton, All Saints Church, Leicester, St Mary's Church, Shrewsbury, St Nicholas' Church, Gloucester, St Swithun's Church, Worcester, and St Werburgh's Church, Derby.  Others stand in remote or isolated positions in the countryside.  Some of these became unused because the village they served was deserted, or the local population moved elsewhere; examples of these include St Cuthbert's Church, Holme Lacy, St Bartholomew's Church, Furtho, Pendock Church, and St Peter's Church, Wolfhampcote.  In other cases the church served the estate of a country house and it is no longer used for that purpose; examples include All Saints Church, Kedleston, St Andrew's Church, Cranford, and Withcote Chapel.  In some cases only part of the church has been conserved.  Only the tower of St Oswald's Church, Lassington has survived, the body of St Mary's Church, Brentingby has been converted into a house, leaving the preserved tower, and in the case of St Werburgh's Church, Derby, the tower and former chancel are preserved, while the rest of the church has been converted for commercial use.

Key

Churches

See also
List of churches preserved by the Churches Conservation Trust in the East of England
List of churches preserved by the Churches Conservation Trust in Northern England
List of churches preserved by the Churches Conservation Trust in Southeast England
List of churches preserved by the Churches Conservation Trust in Southwest England

Notes
The dates given for construction are often not exactly known. Where this is the case the century of first construction of the existing building is given.

References

Bibliography

Churches Conservation Trust in the English Midlands

Churches Conservation Trust in the English Midlands